Kuchen, the German word for cake, is used in other languages as the name for several different types of savory or sweet desserts, pastries, and gateaux. Most Kuchen have eggs, flour and sugar as common ingredients while also, but not always, including some fat. (The sugar might possibly be replaced by honey or even, in cakes directed to diabetic people or people on a diet, a sugar substitute.) In Germany it is a common tradition to invite friends over to one's house or to a cafe between noon and evening to drink coffee and eat Kuchen ("Kaffee und Kuchen").

The term itself may cover as many distinct desserts as its English counterpart "cake". However, the word "cake" covers both Kuchen and Torte, sometimes confused with one another, the key difference being that a Torte is a Kuchen that is decorated or layered with cream, frosting, ganache, or fruit based filling after baking. A Kuchen is typically less decorative or fancy in nature. On the other hand, the word "Kuchen" covers desserts that English would call "pie", such as Apfelkuchen (apple pie). Examples of a Torte made from a base Kuchen include the Jewish Palacsinken Torte and Mohn Torte (or Kindli).

Varieties
 A pie-like pastry, with a thick, "cakey" crust and a sweet custard based or chopped fruit topping, known as an Obstkuchen or a type of fruit cake. This variation sometimes has a sweet icing or decorative cream topping. Variations include Erdbeerkuchen and Apfelkuchen.

People who trace their ancestry to the group known as Germans from Russia call a pastry like the first half of this definition "Kuchen." It is not called Obstkuchen. It is not at all like a fruit cake and it does not have an icing. It is the official South Dakota State Desert. (See the Germans from Russia Heritage Society [grhs.org] and on Facebook, Germans from Russia Food and Culture.)

 A rolled-pastry, specifically called Kuchenrolle, with a long spiral of dough sometimes filled with cream and/or jam, rolled, baked and then sliced to serve. This is sometimes known as a nut roll when nuts are added.
 A coffee cake-like pastry, marbled with veins and pockets of cinnamon, baked throughout; its primary components are butter and sugar. A marble cake or pound cake would be variations of this form, specifically known as a Marmorkuchen and Rührkuchen respectively. Streuselkuchen is a variation of this form.
 A cheese cake-like pastry, specifically called Käsekuchen, with a yeast raised crust, sometimes filled with fruit (cherry is most popular), and a creamy filling made from the German cheese Quark.
 A pan-fried pastry, specifically known as Pfannkuchen, a German pancake thicker than French Crepes and often filled with a sweet or savory filling. An egg based variation is called Eierkuchen.
 A layered pastry, commonly known as a Baumkuchen, made over a spit while brushing on layers of batter.
 A sheet-cake-like pastry, specifically known as Blechkuchen, with variations similar to other forms of Kuchen with the key difference being that this form is baked on a sheet. Can be butter based, known as Butterkuchen, or filled with fruit. Lebkuchen is one such variation commonly made during Christmas.
Kuchen also does not have to fall under a sweet category as there are savory variations of it as well. These are called Pikante Kuchen, with examples such as Zwiebelkuchen, Speckkuchen, and Kartoffelkuchen (often paired with fresh wine or beer).

Jewish variations and traditions

In the United States, back when Jewish immigrants were first arriving in the country, many of the recipes that they brought with them utilized dried fruits as it was difficult to come across fresh ones in their home countries. One that was particularly favored is compote. Desserts have long since changed to become more sophisticated as fresh fruits are now abundant.

Lekach is a Jewish honey cake of German origin. It comes from Lebkuchen, or honey-sweetened gingerbread. This has roots from as early as the twelfth century, when it was customary for boys attending heder (school for Jewish children) to bring a piece of honey cake to the first day of school.

Rugelach is a form of the rolled-pastry variation of Kuchen. They are usually filled with nuts and raisins, with a pastry composed of cheese curds and sour cream.

Mandelbrot, which literally means almond bread, resembles and is served toasted like bread despite not being made of bread dough. They are commonly paired with sweet wine, and when compared to Biscotti they are more "cakey" and softer.

Cultural influence
Kuchen dessert recipes are presumably handed down from people of German heritage and as such are often popular in many areas of German settlement in the United States, particularly Montana, North Dakota, South Dakota, Indiana, Minnesota, and Wisconsin.

Kuchen was introduced into Chilean cuisine when German immigrants settled southern Chile in the 1850s. Kuchen in Chile usually have fruits, such as apples, strawberries or murtas. Nontraditional Chilean Kuchen with walnuts are sometimes offered. Now Kuchen are found in many Chilean bakeries and in many of the larger supermarkets.

In Brazil it is called "cuca", or less commonly, "cuque" and can be found in areas of German settlement, like Rio Grande do Sul, Paraná and Santa Catarina states.

The French quiche was influenced by the savory version of German Kuchen and is now known as a traditional French dish.

In 2000, a Kuchen was designated the state dessert of South Dakota. Introduced by German settlers in the 1870s, Kuchen is now found throughout the state and can be found in peach, apple, prune and chocolate pecan variations.

See also

 Austrian cuisine
 Backe, backe Kuchen
 German cuisine
 List of German desserts
 Saxon cuisine

References 

Cakes
Chilean cuisine
Chilean desserts
German desserts
German pies
Sweet pies
Symbols of South Dakota

de:Kuchen